Qazi Massarrat Hussain (16 March 1935 – 26 August 2021) was a Pakistani field hockey player. He competed in the men's tournament at the 1956 Summer Olympics, winning the silver medal. Hussain died in Karachi on 26 August 2021, at the age of 86.

References

External links
 

1935 births
2021 deaths
Pakistani male field hockey players
Olympic field hockey players of Pakistan
Field hockey players at the 1956 Summer Olympics
Place of birth missing
Olympic silver medalists for Pakistan
Olympic medalists in field hockey
Medalists at the 1956 Summer Olympics
20th-century Pakistani people